Complete list of films produced by the Tollywood film industry based in Madras & Hyderabad in the year 1948.

References

External links
 Earliest Telugu language films at IMDb.com (108 to 113)

1948
Telugu
Telugu films

te:తెలుగు సినిమాలు